Stevens Branch is a stream in Madison County in the U.S. state of Missouri. It is a tributary of Shetley Creek.

Stevens Branch (historically spelled "Stephens Creek") has the name of Billy Stephens, an early settler.

See also
List of rivers of Missouri

References

Rivers of Madison County, Missouri
Rivers of Missouri